Bhookailas is a 2007 Telugu film directed by Siva Nageswara Rao. The film stars Venu Madhav and Gowri Munjal. It is based on the real estate boom of Hyderabad.

Plot 
The film revolves around Kailasam, a hardworking man who lives with his family as a milk man. He is honest and sincere in his life. He delivers milk to people around the village.

Meanwhile, Bhuvaneswari owns a local toddy shop. People come here to drink regularly. One day her regulars ask for toddy, but instead of payment they offer their services. One promises that he'll stitch her blouse for free. Another man being a barber offers to shave her, irritated by this she slaps the man.

Confused, Bhuvaneswari wonders what he is up to. Meanwhile, few real estate agents come and make the people in village to sign with them. They get money quickly due to this and unable to handle the new found wealth they flaunt it. They have parties, massages, trips.

Later Kailasam helps a swami when he faints. The swami sees that Kailasam is no ordinary man and foretells him few things.

Kailasam then quickly finds out the real estate was not right and forces people to leave their own native place. He then fights the baddies saves the village and marries a hometown lover of his. And concludes by saying no more real estate related agonies.

Cast 

 Venu Madhav as Kailasam 
 Gowri Munjal 
 Mumaith Khan 
 Tanikella Bharani 
 Brahmanandam 
 Ali 
 Sunil 
 Rallapalli as Astrologer 
 L. B. Sriram 
 M. S. Narayana 
 Bhuvaneswari as Toddy Shop Owner
 Krishna Bhagavaan 
 Kota Srinivasa Rao 
 Dharmavarapu 
 Mallikharjuna Rao 
 Jayaprakash Reddy 
 Tammareddy Chalapathi Rao 
 Raghubabu 
 Suman Shetty as Teen in toddy shop
 Kondavalasa Lakshmana Rao as Tailor

Soundtrack 
The music was composed by M. M. Keeravani.

References

External links
 
 Filmibeat review
 Indiaglitz review

2007 films
2000s Telugu-language films
Films scored by M. M. Keeravani
Films directed by Siva Nageswara Rao